Michael Mackay McIntyre MBE (born 29 June 1956) is a British sailor, who was the Olympic champion in the Star class event at the 1988 Summer Olympics in Seoul. He also competed at the 1984 Summer Olympics in Los Angeles, and won multiple British Finn class championships. In 1989, McIntyre was awarded an MBE for services to yachting.

Career
At the age of 12, McIntyre was a Scottish schools swimming champion. He was a member of Helensburgh and Bosham Sailing Clubs. McIntyre won the British Finn class Championships in 1980, 1981, and 1984.

McIntyre competed at the 1984 Summer Olympics in Los Angeles, finishing seventh in the Finn class. McIntyre competed at the 1988 Summer Olympics in Seoul and won a gold medal in the Star class, together with Bryn Vaile. McIntyre was the skipper of the team, and the pair had been in fourth place going into the final race. The pair won the event after the American pair of Mark Reynolds and Hal Haenel had to retire in the final race due to a broken mast; the Canadian team who were ahead of the Britons also  retired from the race, due to a damaged backstay. It was the first Olympic Star class medal by a British team since 1932, when Colin Ratsey and Peter Jaffe finished second in the event.

McIntyre retired from sailing after the 1988 Olympics. In 2012, McIntyre made a one-off return to sailing for an event at the Weymouth and Portland National Sailing Academy on the 2012 Summer Olympics course. His race was ended by a collision with another yacht.

Personal life
McIntyre was born in Glasgow, and his father was a veterinary surgeon. He grew up in Shandon, Argyll, and attended Hermitage Academy, and later the University of Glasgow. McIntyre later lived in Salisbury, England, where he worked in sales management. Despite living in England, McIntyre is an honorary president of Helensburgh Sailing Club in Scotland, and he is also a lifetime honorary member of the Hayling Island Sailing Club.

McIntyre was appointed MBE in the 1989 New Year Honours, for services to yachting. McIntyre is married, and has multiple children. His daughter Eilidh is a sailor, who won a gold medal in the 470 event at the delayed 2020 Summer Olympics.

References

External links
 
 
 

British male sailors (sport)
Sailors at the 1984 Summer Olympics – Finn
Sailors at the 1988 Summer Olympics – Star
Olympic sailors of Great Britain
Olympic gold medallists for Great Britain
Scottish Olympic medallists
1956 births
Living people
Members of the Order of the British Empire
Sportspeople from Glasgow
Olympic medalists in sailing
Medalists at the 1988 Summer Olympics
Alumni of the University of Glasgow
People educated at Hermitage Academy